The Elizabeth Islands are a chain of small islands extending southwest from the southern coast of Cape Cod, Massachusetts in the United States. They are located at the outer edge of Buzzards Bay, north of Martha's Vineyard, from which they are separated by Vineyard Sound, and constitute the town of Gosnold in Dukes County, Massachusetts.

History

The islands were long known to and utilized by the Wampanoag and other indigenous peoples prior to European colonization. Europeans first learned of the islands in 1602 when the English colonizer Bartholomew Gosnold sighted them on his way to Virginia. However it was not until 1641, subsequent to the successful establishment of the first English North American colonies, that colonizers formally laid claim to and settled the islands in the name of the English Crown as part of the country's nascent imperial expansion. At this time they renamed the islands after Elizabeth I, who had been Queen of England when the islands had first been discovered by Europeans. In 1641, Thomas Mayhew the Elder, of Watertown, Massachusetts, bought the islands—along with Nantucket and Martha's Vineyard—from William Alexander, the Earl of Stirling.

Before the creation of the Province of Massachusetts Bay in 1691, the islands were part of the extinct Dukes County, New York. The first known European inhabitant was Francis Usselton, who had been banished at the time for making secret trades with the local Indians without consent from the governor.

Geography and demographics
The total land area of the islands is 34.55 km² (13.34 sq mi); and there was a permanent population of 75 persons as of the 2010 census, making it the smallest town in Massachusetts.

Named islands 
All of the Elizabeth Islands, except Cuttyhunk and Penikese, are privately owned by the Forbes family. Stretching south-west from land's end at Falmouth, Massachusetts, the islands are:
Nonamesset Island, the closest to the mainland
Veckatimest, a small island.
Gull Island, a small uninhabited island.
Uncatena Island, uninhabited as of the 2000 Census
Composed of the main island along with the smaller Nonamesset, Monohansett, Bull, Cedar, and Bachelor islands. Owned by the Forbes' Naushon Island Trust, and while it is not generally open to the public, the Forbes family has set aside Tarpaulin Cove to the south and Kettle Cove to the north as well as Bull Island and Hadley Harbor to the northeast for public enjoyment including picknicking.
The Weepecket Islands, three small, publicly accessible islands north of central Naushon owned by the Forbes family.  These islands offer very few places to land, are nearly obscured by water, and are home to numerous shore birds, seals and other animals.
A shallow tidal creek cuts part way through the island.
Baret Island, located off the north shore of Nashawena Island.
Rock Island, located off the north shore of Nashawena Island.
Penikese is owned by the Commonwealth of Massachusetts and has a colorful history. It was the site of a groundbreaking 19th-century research facility that was the precursor to the famed Marine Biological Laboratory (MBL) in Woods Hole, was the site of the state's only leper colony in the early 20th century, and is currently a bird sanctuary and site of the Penikese Island School, a 35-year-old school for troubled teens.
Cuttyhunk Island, farthest west in the chain, and home to most of Gosnold's municipal population. Like Penikese, Cuttyhunk is not owned by the Forbes family, and therefore much of the island is publicly accessible.
Gosnold Island, located in Westend Pond on Cuttyhunk Island.

Named channels 

Channels with strong tidal currents, known locally as holes, separate the islands from each other and the mainland. At high tide, water flows from Buzzards Bay to the Vineyard Sound. Near mid-tide the water stops and reverses, filling the Bay at low tide.

Listed from northeast to southwest, the named channels are:
Woods Hole separating the mainland from Nonamesset Island
Robinson's Hole between Naushon Island and Pasque Island
Quick's Hole between Pasque Island and Nashawena Island
Canapitsit Channel between Nashawena Island and Cuttyhunk Island.

Named harbors and coves 
Cuttyhunk Harbor is sheltered on its east by Nashawena Island on its west by Cuttyhunk Island and on its north by Penikese Island.
Tarpaulin Cove on the south shore of Naushon Island.

References

External links 

Cuttyhunk Historical Society, the Museum of the Elizabeth Islands 
Bathymetry of the Waters Surrounding the Elizabeth Islands, Massachusetts United States Geological Survey

 
Islands of Dukes County, Massachusetts
Coastal islands of Massachusetts
Private islands of Massachusetts